After Office Hours is a 1932 British romantic drama film directed by Thomas Bentley and starring Frank Lawton, Viola Lyel and Garry Marsh.

The film was based on the 1931 play London Wall by John Van Druten with several of the cast reprising their roles from the original stage production. The film was produced by the British film studio British International Pictures at their Elstree Studios.

Premise
Office romance, in which Hec is in love with secretary Pat, and fellow secretary Miss Janus, older and wiser, takes it upon herself to concoct a plan to help him receive the empty-headed Pat's affections.

Cast
 Frank Lawton as Hec 
 Heather Angel as Pat 
 Viola Lyel as Miss Janus 
 Garry Marsh as Brewer 
 Eileen Peel as Miss Bufton 
 Frank Royde as Mr. Walker 
 Katie Johnson as Miss Wilesden 
 Nadine March as Miss Hooper

References

External links
 
 
 

1932 films
Films shot at British International Pictures Studios
1930s English-language films
Films directed by Thomas Bentley
1932 romantic drama films
British films based on plays
Films set in London
British black-and-white films
British romantic drama films
1930s British films